Matteo Di Piazza (born 1 Jan 1988) is an Italian footballer who plays as a forward for Barletta.

Career
Di Piazza made his Serie C debut for Rimini on 24 August 2009 in a game against Pescara.

On 18 January 2019, he signed a 2.5-year contract with Catania.

On 22 January 2020 he joined Catanzaro on a 2.5-year contract. On 28 January 2021 he returned to Catania on loan.

On 16 August 2021, he moved to Fidelis Andria.

On 19 August 2022, Di Piazza signed with Brindisi in Serie D.

On 1 December 2022, Di Piazza signed with Barletta in Serie D.

Honours

Club 
Foggia
 Lega Pro: 2016–17 (Group C)
 Supercoppa di Serie C: 2017

Lecce
 Serie C: 2017–18 (Group C)

Individual 
Performances
 Coppa Italia top-goalscorer: 2017–18 (shared, 4 goals)

References

External links
 

1988 births
Living people
People from Partinico
Sportspeople from the Province of Palermo
Footballers from Sicily
Italian footballers
Association football forwards
Serie B players
Serie C players
Lega Pro Seconda Divisione players
Serie D players
Catania S.S.D. players
A.C. Savoia 1908 players
Benevento Calcio players
F.C. Südtirol players
Rimini F.C. 1912 players
U.S. Siracusa players
A.C. ChievoVerona players
F.C. Pro Vercelli 1892 players
A.S. Gubbio 1910 players
S.S. Maceratese 1922 players
S.S. Akragas Città dei Templi players
L.R. Vicenza players
Calcio Foggia 1920 players
U.S. Lecce players
Cosenza Calcio players
U.S. Catanzaro 1929 players
S.S. Fidelis Andria 1928 players
S.S.D. Città di Brindisi players